Verbekaria is an african genus of flies in the family Sciomyzidae, the marsh flies or snail-killing flies.

Species
V. punctipennis Knutson, 1968

References

Sciomyzidae
Sciomyzoidea genera